BYD Auto Co., Ltd. ("Build Your Dreams") is the automotive subsidiary of the publicly-listed Chinese multinational manufacturer BYD Company, headquartered in Xi'an, Shaanxi Province, China. It was founded in January 2003, following BYD Company's acquisition of Qinchuan Automobile Company in 2002. The company produces passenger cars, buses, trucks, electric bicycles, forklifts, and rechargeable batteries. The current model range of automobiles includes battery electric vehicles (BEVs) and plug-in hybrid electric vehicles (PHEVs), and the company also produced petrol engine vehicles up until March 2022.

In June 2022, BYD Auto announced that it had sold about 641,000 EVs in the first half of 2022, overtaking Tesla to become the largest EV manufacturer in the world. In 2022, it became the first carmaker in the world to sell a million NEVs, a term used in the Chinese market to describe most electric vehicles.

As of 2021, BYD was the fourth largest plug-in electric vehicle (BEV and PHEV) company and fourth largest BEV company in the world, with 9.1% and 7% global market share respectively in 2021. The company has mainly based its sales in Mainland China, but is undertaking rapid expansion into the global market, with sales hitting over 100,000 per month in March 2022, and was expecting to sell between 1.5 million to 2 million plug-in EVs in 2022, around 3 to 4 times the volume compared to 2021. 

The company also has an electric battery division, FinDreams Battery, which is the world's third largest producer of electric vehicle batteries with a global market share of 12% in the first half of 2022, and a focus mainly on lithium iron phosphate batteries.

History

BYD Co Ltd founded the wholly-owned subsidiary BYD Auto in 2003, after acquiring the Qinchuan Machinery Works from Norinco in 2002 and raising HK$1.6 billion on the Hong Kong Stock Exchange. The acquisition may have been made solely to acquire the passenger car production license held by the purchased company. Qinchuan had been manufacturing cars since 1987, when the company began production of the  QJC7050 model. At the time of the acquisition, its QCJ7181 Flyer was in production, which from 2005 was rebadged to the "BYD Flyer."

In 2008, a plug-in hybrid version of the BYD F3 compact sedan was introduced, the world's first production model plug-in hybrid car. In September of that year, Berkshire Hathaway took a HK$1.8 billion stake (US$ 232 million) in the parent company through Sino-American Energy Holdings.

BYD's total car sales in 2009 were 448,400 vehicles, and the BYD F3 was the best-selling sedan in China that year. In the same year, BYD began the export of its cars to Africa, South America, and the Middle East, where the cars competed on price, not quality.

In 2012, the city government of Shenzhen purchased 500 BYD e6 cars for use as taxis. A total of 506,189 passenger cars were sold in China in 2013, making it the tenth-largest selling brand.

In 2013, BYD was awarded The Top Crash Facility Award of the year 2013.

In 2014, the BYD Qin plug-in hybrid compact sedan, the first model of BYD's new "Dynasty Series", had total sales of 14,747 (plus a relatively small number of sales in Latin America), In 2015, sales of the Qin increased to 31,898 and it was the 88th highest selling sedan in China. In 2016, the BYD Tang plug-in hybrid SUV had 31,405 sales, the plug-in hybrid version of the Qin compact sedan had 21,868 sales, and the BYD e6 electric compact MPV had 20,605 sales. By 2016, total sales of the Qin reached 68,655 cars.

In 2015, the company was planning to open factories in Brazil to produce electric cars and buses. In July 2015, exports to Russia were suspended, due to the Russo-Ukrainian War and the falling value of the Russian currency. BYD was the highest-selling brand of highway-legal light-duty plug-in electric vehicles (combined sales for plug-in hybrids and battery electric cars), with 61,772 passenger vehicles sold, mostly plug-in hybrids. BYD continued as the world's top-selling plug-in car manufacturer in 2016 with over 100,000 units sold, up 64% from 2015. BYD sold more than 100,000 new energy passenger cars in China in 2016. The BYD Tang crossover SUV was the top-selling plug-in car in China in 2016 with 31,405 units delivered.

BYD achieved top rankings in the 2015 J.D. Power Quality Study.

In September 2016, the company became the third-largest manufacturer of plug-in cars, with a total of 161,000 plug-in cars produced since 2008. Also, in September 2016, the company introduced a range of electric sanitation truck models, to be used in Beijing.

Since 2017, BYD has been negatively impacted by a reduction of subsidies granted by the Chinese government.

In May 2020, BYD announced that it would start expanding in Europe, starting with Norway. BYD's launch will consist of the BYD Tang and a range of commercial vehicles. However, Australia also announced that there will be 2,000 BYD electric vehicles in the fleet as part of the new taxi operator ETaxiCo. The fleet will be operated from three sites in the Northern Beaches Council area as part of a six-month trial, When the program launches – which is at this current time planned for following months depending on COVID-19 factors – it will be using 15 specially-fitted e6 electric compact SUVs that have been imported by Nexport, with plans to expand the fleet to 120 by August. It is expected to be reach the goal of up to 2,000 vehicles in the fleet by the end of 2021.

BYD will deliver a total of 1,002 electric buses to Bogota, the capital city of Colombia, by mid-2022, after winning a contract for 406 electric buses in January 2021.

On April 4, 2022, BYD announced that it had stopped the production of all automobiles powered only by gasoline engines, with the final gasoline model rolling off the assembly line in March 2022, and will turn its focus to manufacturing innovative high-tech battery electric and plug-in hybrid cars and trucks. It will continue to produce and supply the components for existing BYD internal combustion engine (ICE) vehicles so as to continually provide comprehensive service and after-sales support to existing customers.

In June 2022, BYD Auto announced that it had sold about 641,000 EV's in the first half of 2022, overtaking Tesla to become the largest EV manufacturer in the world.

In July 2022, BYD announced that electric vehicles will be sold to Japan from 2023. On 5 December 2022, it was reported that the Atto 3 would be among the vehicles included in the lineup for the Japanese market.

In August 2022, BYD x Rêver Automotive announced that electric vehicles will be sold to Thailand from 10 October 2022.

BYD Design Center 
In 2019, BYD launched its global design center, which is led by a team of industry veterans from Audi, Ferrari, and Mercedes-Benz. Leading the team is Wolfgang Egger. The carmaker unveiled its E-SEED GT, the first joint effort from the new design team, at the Auto Shanghai industry show in April 2019. The futuristic design concept reflects the sleek lines of the Chinese dragon, and the company plans to feature more Chinese cultural symbols in future models. At the present time, the Chinese corporation has over 190,000 individuals working for it all over the globe and generates approximately $9.1 billion in revenue. The production of mobile phone batteries was where the firm got its start, but they swiftly expanded their offerings to include original equipment manufacturer (OEM) phones for the information technology sector.

Technologies

DM (dual mode) hybrid
The BYD DM hybrid technology was first introduced in the late 2000s, on vehicles such as the BYD F3DM and BYD M3 DM. It consisted of a conventional ICE engine and transmission as well as an electric motor and batteries. It has since been replaced by DM-i and DM-p technology.

DM-i / DM-p 
In 2020, BYD released DM-i and DM-p to replace DM technology, DM-i for front-wheel drive efficiency-oriented models and DM-p for all-wheel drive performance-oriented models. It is a series-parallel plug-in hybrid technology with a dedicated hybrid transmission (DHT). It consists of a high-efficiency ICE engine (Xiaoyun) (which can power an electrical generator) and a main electric motor (which can be powered by both batteries and an electrical generator). The Xiaoyun engine uses the Atkinson cycle, has an ultra-high compression ratio (CR) of 15.5, and has a Brake Thermal Efficiency (BTE) of 43%, the highest in the world for a production gasoline engine.

Depending on the scenario, the hybrid drivetrain will use different components to provide driving power, including battery-only mode, battery + electrical generator mode, engine only mode (only available at high speeds due to lack of transmission), and battery + engine mode. The engine will also provide charge to the batteries via the generator when conditions permit. The design allows the engine RPM to always remain within its high efficiency zone.

DM-i is currently available with three power levels, codenamed EHS132, EHS145, and EHS160, using 1.5L, 1.5L or 1.5T, 1.5T Xiaoyun engines respectively.

e-Platform 3.0

The e-Platform 3.0 is a new modular car platform unveiled in 2021 said to be "the cradle for the next generation of EVs". It is a platform specialised for only battery electric vehicles (BEVs), unlike previous vehicle platforms which had to make design compromises for the hybrid vehicle drivetrains of its DM ("dual mode", i.e. plug-in hybrid) variants. Standard improvements include better integration of BYD's proprietary blade battery technology with an improved pure electric frame structure with doubled torsional stiffness, a newly upgraded 8-in-1 module for the drive system allowing the overall efficiency to exceed 89%, a direct cooling and heating system for the battery pack (utilising residual heat from surroundings, powertrain, passenger compartment, and even the battery itself) to increase thermal efficiency by up to 20%, and shorter front overhangs, lower body profile, and a longer wheelbase to improve aerodynamics (0.21 cd) and passenger space. Power consumption per 100 kilometers is reduced by 10%, and the cruising range is 10% longer in winter.

The platform enables all-electric ranges exceeding , with 800-volt fast charging technology for a range up to  after 5-minutes of charging and allows an all wheel drive (AWD) system with 0-100 km/h (62 mph) acceleration of 2.9 seconds, though not all cars designed with this platform will reach this max performance. It also allows for the use of cell-to-body (CTB) battery integration. CTB replaces the previous cell-to-pack (CTP) technology which had been launched by Contemporary Amperex Technology and then dismissed by them in 2019.

The first car designed using this platform was the Yuan Plus (also known as "Atto 3" in global markets), followed by all electric cars in the new "Ocean Series" such as the Dolphin (also known as "Atto 2") and Seal (also known as "Atto 4").

Current products

Personal vehicles

E-Series 

 BYD e1 city car (BEV)
 BYD e2 compact hatchback (BEV)
 BYD e3 compact sedan, the sedan variant of the e2 (BEV)
 BYD e6 compact MPV (BEV)
 BYD e9 mid-size sedan (BEV)

Dynasty Series 

The Dynasty Series (王朝系列) started in August 2013 with the launch of the plug-in hybrid (PHEV) variant of the petrol-engined BYD Surui, the BYD Qin. The BYD Qin replaced the aging BYD F3DM, and quickly became the best-selling electric vehicle of early 2014.  BYD followed the Qin with the launch of BYD Tang in 2015. This series marked the formal transition of BYD's focus into developing new energy vehicles.
 BYD Qin compact sedan (PHEV/BEV)
 BYD Qin Pro compact sedan (PHEV/BEV)
 BYD Qin Plus compact sedan (PHEV/BEV)
 BYD Tang mid-size SUV (PHEV/BEV)
 BYD Song compact SUV (PHEV/BEV)
 BYD Song Pro compact SUV (PHEV/BEV)
 BYD Song Plus compact SUV (PHEV/BEV)
 BYD Song Max MPV (PHEV/BEV)
 BYD Han mid-size luxury sedan (PHEV/BEV)
 BYD Yuan subcompact crossover SUV (BEV)
 BYD S2 subcompact SUV based on the Yuan (BEV)
 BYD Yuan Plus subcompact crossover SUV, also known as Atto 3 (BEV)

Ocean Series 

The Ocean Series (海洋系列) is a series of plug-in electric vehicles based on the Ocean-X, BYD's new mid-size performance car design concept. The series includes two vehicle lines, one being pure electric vehicles named after sea animals; the other being plug-in hybrid electric vehicles named after naval ships.
 BYD Dolphin subcompact hatchback, also known as Atto 2 (BEV)
 BYD Seal compact executive sedan, also known as Atto 4 (BEV)
 BYD Seagull city car (BEV)
 BYD Sea Lion compact crossover (BEV)
 BYD Destroyer 05 compact sedan (PHEV)
 BYD Frigate 05 compact crossover SUV (PHEV)
 BYD Frigate 07 mid-size SUV (PHEV)
 BYD Landing Ship MPV (PHEV)

Commercial Vehicles

Transit buses 

 BYD K6 electric bus (7m/23 ft)
 BYD K7 (K7M) electric bus (8m/26 ft)
 BYD K8 electric bus (10.5m/35 ft)
 BYD K9 (K9M and K9S) electric bus (12m/40 ft)
 BYD K10 electric bus (double decker, 10m/32 ft)
 BYD K11 electric bus (articulated, 18m/60 ft)
 BYD B series, successor for the K series.

Coaches 

 BYD C6 electric coach (7m/23 ft)
 BYD C8 electric coach (10.5m/35 ft)
 BYD C9 electric coach (12m/40 ft) 
 BYD C10 electric coach (14m/45 ft)

Taxis 

 BYD D1 compact MPV developed with DiDi exclusively for ride hailing services

Vans 
 BYD T3 (commercial electric van)
 BYD V3 microvan.
 BYD Class 6 electric Step Van

Trucks 

 BYD T5 (Class 5 electric truck)
 BYD T7 (Class 6 electric truck)
 BYD T8 (Class 8 electric truck)
 BYD T10 (Class 8 electric truck)
 BYD 8TT (Class 8 electric semi-truck)
 BYD Q1M / BYD 8Y (Class 8 Terminal tractor)

Former models 
BYD e5 compact sedan (electric vehicle)
BYD F0 supermini (petrol engine)
BYD F3-R compact hatchback
 BYD F3 compact sedan (petrol engine, 2005-2021)
 BYD F3DM compact sedan (plug-in hybrid, 2008-2013), the PHEV variant of the F3, the first mass-produced PHEV in the world
 BYD Surui compact sedan (petrol engine), also known as the F3 Plus, the second-generation of the F3 and the basis for the e5 and the BYD Qin
BYD F6 mid-size saloon
BYD Flyer city car (2003–2008)
BYD G3 compact saloon
BYD G3-R compact hatchback
BYD G5 compact saloon successor to the BYD G3
BYD G6 mid-size sedan
BYD L3 (or New F3) - compact saloon
 BYD M6 MPV
 BYD S1 subcompact crossover SUV
 BYD S6 SUV
 BYD S7 SUV
 BYD S8 convertible

Facilities 

Industrial facilities consist of two manufacturing plants in Xi'an, an R&D center and manufacturing plant in Shenzhen (the headquarters of BYD Co Ltd), a manufacturing plant in Changsha, a manufacturing plant in Shaoguan, and an R&D center and parts plant in Shanghai. Construction of a third manufacturing plant in Xi'an resumed in 2011, following the company being fined for illegal land use.

Manufacturing plants for buses opened in Dalian, Liaoning province, in late 2014 and Lancaster, California, in May 2013. A factory was inaugurated in Brazil in 2015 for the production of electric buses. A bus plant was opened in 2019 in Newmarket, Ontario, to handle orders in Canada. BYD has an electric bus assembly facility in Europe in Komarom, Hungary.

BYD Auto is the EV producer with the world's highest degree of vertical integration.

Joint ventures

Denza 

In May 2010, the Shenzhen BYD Daimler New Technology Co., Ltd., trading as "Denza" was established with Daimler AG to produce luxury electric vehicles. The Denza 500 model is based on the previous generation Mercedes-Benz B-Class.

Toyota joint venture 
BYD and Toyota announced a partnership to jointly develop BEVs in July 2019. On April 2020, the partnership was formalized as a joint venture. The partnership was reportedly instigated after Toyota executives were impressed by the value, design, and quality of the BYD Tang hybrid.

The joint venture is called BYD Toyota EV Technology Co., Ltd., with head offices in Shenzhen, China.

Yangwang

Alexander Dennis 

BYD have supplied electric bus chassies to Alexander Dennis who have built their Enviro200EV single-deck and Enviro400EV double-deck products on them.

Sales
In 2010, BYD sold a total of 519,800 vehicles, representing 2.9% of the market in China and the sixth largest manufacturer. In 2011, the BYD sales rank was outside the top ten. In 2012, the company became the 9th largest car manufacturer in China, producing over 600,000 vehicles.

The majority of vehicles are sold within China; however export markets include Bahrain, the Dominican Republic, Ukraine, and Moldova.

The North American headquarters opened in Los Angeles in 2011. As of 2013 BYD Auto sells the e6 and Electric Bus in the United States as fleet vehicles only. BYD has supplied the Los Angeles Metro system with buses since 2015. A 2018 investigation by the Los Angeles Times found reliability issues with the BYD buses.

Lawsuits and controversies

See also

List of automobile manufacturers of China
Luxgen

References

External links 

 

 
Car manufacturers of China
Electric vehicle manufacturers of China
Electric bus manufacturers
Manufacturing companies based in Xi'an
Plug-in hybrid vehicle manufacturers
Car brands
Chinese brands
Vehicle manufacturing companies established in 2003
Chinese companies established in 2003
Bus manufacturers of China
Battery electric vehicle manufacturers